What's Up Doc? is a British children's entertainment show that aired on ITV on Saturday mornings from 5 September 1992 to 29 April 1995. It was hosted by Andy Crane, Yvette Fielding, and Pat Sharp. For the later part of the series, Jenny Powell replaced Fielding for the final part of the series.

The first two series were produced at The Maidstone Studios before moving to the studios of Scottish Television in Glasgow for the final series.

Format
The series included a variety of characters like Simon Perry, Colin, Wooly, Billy Box, Baljit, Pasty the Worm, Mister Spanky, Naughty Torty, Gaston, Sam Sam, Bro, and Bro, the Wolves. What's Up Doc? was designed to promote and feature products created by Warner Bros. in the UK which included video games, movies, tours of their studios, and of course, their vast library of Looney Tunes animated shorts from which the "What's up Doc?" catchphrase was derived, and new animated series; Animaniacs, Batman: The Animated Series and Taz-Mania.

What's Up Doc? made use of the "phone-in" game format made popular by BBC mainstays such as Going Live, using revolutionary for the time games technology to escalate the experience thanks in part to the budget and resources of Warner Bros. Phone-in games that featured on the programme included Hugo the Troll and Joe Razz. The show was also responsible for the success of Batman: The Animated Series and Animaniacs on terrestrial television. Music was also a huge part of the show and played a large role in launching the careers of music groups Take That, East 17 and Eternal.

What's Up Doc? was also notorious for launching the careers of puppet comedians Don Austen and John Eccleston as the show's central new puppet characters, a pair of wolf brothers named Bro and Bro who, amongst other dastardly deeds, would comically "devour" any celebrity guest on the losing side of the phone-in games. The pair soon earned a spin-off series, Wolf It, on the weekday Children's ITV block.

Despite its initial success, What's Up Doc? soon became memorable for its numerous run-ins with the ITC, whom consistently frowned upon the show's original antics of anarchic humour that was often considered insensitive for a Saturday morning children's programme. Concerned that Warner Bros. would pull the plug on their involvement with the show, Scottish requested that the show's humour was toned down to an acceptable level. The show's producers refused and eventually resigned at the end of the second series, along with many of its cast - including Don Austen and John Eccleston, the puppeteers behind Bro and Bro (the pair swiftly defected to rival show Live & Kicking the following year to star as the leprechaun puppets Sage & Onion).

The third series saw production move to Scottish Television's own studios in Glasgow, but without much of its original cast, the show had lost its charm and appeal, and a decline in ratings led to it being axed in April 1995.

Series guide

References

External links
 
 What's Up Doc? on Paul Morris' SatKids

1990s British children's television series
1992 British television series debuts
1995 British television series endings
ITV children's television shows
Looney Tunes television series
British television shows featuring puppetry
Television shows produced by Scottish Television
Television shows produced by Television South (TVS)
Television series by Warner Bros. Television Studios
English-language television shows